Kakhi Kakhiashvili (born 13 July 1969 in Tskhinvali, Georgian SSR, USSR) is a Georgian-Greek weightlifter, one of only five weightlifters to have won three consecutive gold medals at Olympic Games. He won his first at Barcelona 1992, competing with the Unified Team, and later as a citizen of Greece at Atlanta 1996 and in Sydney 2000. He won three Senior World Championships (1995, 1998, 1999), was twice a silver medalist at the Senior World Championships (1993 and 1994), and set seven world records during his career. He was named the 1996 and 1999 Greek Male Athlete of the Year.

Kakhiashvili was born in Tskhinvali, Georgia, to a Georgian father and a Greek mother, Maria Lamprianidi. He is renowned in weightlifting circles for his uncanny ability to lift exactly what was required to win. Dubbed as a "computer" by some competitors, he also had the ability to block out everything that was not relevant to the competition at hand.

Career
At the 1992 Summer Olympics lifting for the Unified Team in the 90 kg category, he went against the instructions of his coach Vasily Alexeev, the all-time weightlifting great. His coach wanted his Russian teammate Sergey Syrtsov to win the contest and did not let Kakhiashvili try to lift heavier to beat the Russian. During the snatch portion of the competition, it looked like Sergey Syrtsov was going to win, with a 12.5 kg lead over Kakhiashvili from an Olympic Record 190.0 kg snatch. During the clean & jerk portion of the competition Kakhiashvili lifted 225.0 kg on his second attempt, giving him a total of 402.5 kg, a full 10.0 kg less than Syrstov. Kakhi ordered 10 kg more to be put on the bar in order to beat his Russian teammate. He successfully lifted the 235.0 kg clean and jerk, giving him a total of 412.5 kg. Event though his total tied Syrstov, Kakhiashvili won the gold medal due to virtue of a lighter bodyweight, (89.25 kg vs. 89.45 kg) this performance established his right to the title of one of the sports elite lifters.

Major results

Notes and references 
  Not a world record at the time of the competition, became a world record when IWF decided to eliminate the world standards from the list of World Records on 24 June 2008.

External links 
 Akakide Kakhiashvilis at Lift Up
 Akakide Kakhiashvilis – Hall of Fame at Weightlifting Exchange
 
 

1969 births
Living people
Male weightlifters from Georgia (country)
Greek male weightlifters
Weightlifters at the 1992 Summer Olympics
Olympic weightlifters of the Unified Team
Olympic gold medalists for the Unified Team
Olympic weightlifters of Greece
Olympic gold medalists for Greece
Olympic medalists in weightlifting
Medalists at the 1992 Summer Olympics
Medalists at the 1996 Summer Olympics
Medalists at the 2000 Summer Olympics
Weightlifters at the 1996 Summer Olympics
Weightlifters at the 2000 Summer Olympics
Weightlifters at the 2004 Summer Olympics
World record holders in Olympic weightlifting
People from Tskhinvali
Soviet people of Greek descent
Georgian people of Greek descent
Georgian emigrants to Greece
Naturalized citizens of Greece
Recipients of the Presidential Order of Excellence
European Weightlifting Championships medalists
World Weightlifting Championships medalists